Ângelo Monteiro dos Santos Victoriano (born 8 February 1968 in Luanda) is a former Angolan basketball player.  He was listed at 6’5” and 246 pounds.

Victoriano appeared on four Angolan Olympic basketball teams (in 1992, 1996, 2000, and 2004), serving as captain in his final appearance. At the club level, he won a total of 11 national championship titles, one with ASA, four with Petro Atlético and six with Primeiro de Agosto. He won 10 Angolan Cups, 8 Super Cups and 2 Africa Club Championships with Primeiro de Agosto.  His brothers, Edmar Victoriano and Puna Victoriano, also played for Angola's national basketball team.

Victoriano is the only African player, to have won 8 FIBA Africa championships, ahead of Jean-Jacques Conceição, and Carlos Almeida, both with 7.

External links
 
CBS Sportsline profile
Angola aims high in face of adversity, 2004 article from The Guardian.

1968 births
Living people
Basketball players from Luanda
Angolan men's basketball players
1990 FIBA World Championship players
Atlético Petróleos de Luanda basketball players
Atlético Sport Aviação basketball players
Barreirense Basket players
C.A. Queluz players
C.D. Primeiro de Agosto men's basketball players
Basketball players at the 1992 Summer Olympics
Basketball players at the 1996 Summer Olympics
Basketball players at the 2000 Summer Olympics
Basketball players at the 2004 Summer Olympics
Olympic basketball players of Angola
Small forwards
Angolan expatriate basketball people in Portugal
2002 FIBA World Championship players
1994 FIBA World Championship players